The Bicycles May Use Full Lane sign, also referred to as BMUFL or R4-11, first officially specified in Chapter 9B of the 2009 Manual on Uniform Traffic Control Devices, is a traffic sign used in the United States to:
 designate roads with lanes that are too narrow to be safely shared side-by-side by a bicycle and another vehicle to indicate that bicyclists may occupy the full lane to discourage unsafe within-lane passing 
 encourage bicyclists to use the full lane to discourage unsafe within-lane passing 
 encourage motorists to change lanes to pass bicyclists
 warn motorists that bicyclists may be using the full lane

The sign consists of a graphic image of a bicycle, followed by the words, "May Use Full Lane".

Sign effectiveness
A study conducted by the City of Austin in 2010 showed that placement of BMUFL signs influenced cyclists to generally ride farther from the curb (an average of 0.31 feet), and drivers moved further left as they passed bikes after the signs were installed, such that the percentage of motorists who passed within three feet of the bicyclist dropped from 44% to 0%.

Guidance for placement
The 2012 edition of the California Manual on Uniform Traffic Control Devices indicates that the Bicycles May Use Full Lane Sign be used "where travel lanes are too narrow for bicyclists and motor vehicles to operate side by side" to "inform users that bicyclists might occupy the travel lane":

Bicycle May Use Full signs are not approved for use in Michigan according to the September 2013 Edition of the Michigan Manual on Uniform Traffic Control Devices since they are "not applicable" under state law.

Early Installations

California
In 2012, the City of Encinitas, California installed shared lane markings and Bicycles May Use Full Lane signs along Coast Highway 101 to "alert motorists that cyclists have the legal right to take the lane".

Florida
The Bicycles May Use Full Lane Sign was adopted for use by the Florida Department of Transportation in January, 2011.  By March 17, 2012 the signs were installed in at least three locations.

Kentucky
In July 2012, 31 Bicycles May Use Full Lane signs were installed in Louisville, Kentucky.  Dirk Gowin, an engineering project coordinator with the Louisville Metro Department of Public Works & Assets, points out that to accommodate a car and bicycle safely side-by-side within a lane, the lane would have to be "13 or 14 feet wide".  The signs were installed on roads like River Road, with lanes from 11 to 12 feet in width.

Maine
Bicycles May Use Full Lane signs were installed on William Clarke Drive in Westbrook in 2011, and since then have been used in multiple places in Portland, including sections of Outer Congress Street and St. John Street.

Maryland
Twenty Bicycles May Use Full Lane signs were installed by the City of Baltimore in 2012.

After 600 cyclists objected to an initial decision to reject the sign, in 2012, the Maryland State Highway Administration posted Bicycles May Use Full Lane signs along Maryland Route 953 in Glenn Dale, and announced plans to post more such signs in Montgomery and Prince George's counties.

Minnesota
Bicyclists May Use Full Lane signs were first installed in Minnesota in 2011, including on a downhill section of Marshall Avenue in St. Paul "where the travel lane is less than 14' wide".

Missouri
Bicycles May Use Full Lane signs were installed on Florissant Rd. in Ferguson, Missouri in 2012.

Vermont
Bicycles May Use Full Lane signs were installed in 2012 on multiple streets in Burlington, VT including North Ave., Riverside Ave., Pine St. and Shelburne Rd.

References

External links
 Manual on Uniform Traffic Control Devices part 9b
Effects of Shared Lane Markings on Bicyclist and Motorist Behavior along Multi-Lane Facilities

Cycling in the United States
Cycling safety
Manual on Uniform Traffic Control Devices
Vehicular cycling